The 2001 British Open Championships was held at the Edgbaston Priory Club with the later stages at the National Indoor Arena from 5–10 June 2001. David Palmer won the title defeating Chris Walker in the final. Peter Nicol represented England from 2001 and six times champion Jansher Khan announced his official retirement after unsuccessful double surgery on both knees.

Seeds

Draw and results

Main draw

References

Men's British Open Squash Championships
Squash in England
Men's British Open
Men's British Open Squash Championship
Men's British Open Squash Championship
Sports competitions in Birmingham, West Midlands
2000s in Birmingham, West Midlands